Dunback, formerly Waihemo, is a small town in the Otago region of New Zealand. It is located between Palmerston and Ranfurly on Highway 85. It has a population of about 200 people. Most of these people live in the rural areas near the town.

The only remaining buildings now that still stand are the church, the Highwayman Hotel, the coronation hall and the Dunback school. All of these buildings are over 100 years old. There is also the domain which includes a cricket field, camping ground and bowling green. Locals and campers both enjoy the facilities that it has to offer. Along Murphy Street also stands the swing bridge which was built in the early 1900s for pupils to cross the Shag River for easier access to the school.

From 29 August 1885 until 1 January 1968, the town was the terminus of the Dunback Branch, a branch line railway that left the Main South Line in Palmerston. Nowadays, some of the old railway formation, a loading bank at the site of the station yard, and other railway relics can still be found around Dunback.

Demographics

Waihemo had a population of 1,341 at the 2018 New Zealand census, an increase of 21 people (1.6%) since the 2013 census, and an increase of 69 people (5.4%) since the 2006 census. There were 585 households. There were 690 males and 654 females, giving a sex ratio of 1.06 males per female. The median age was 49.9 years (compared with 37.4 years nationally), with 231 people (17.2%) aged under 15 years, 144 (10.7%) aged 15 to 29, 687 (51.2%) aged 30 to 64, and 279 (20.8%) aged 65 or older.

Ethnicities were 92.6% European/Pākehā, 9.4% Māori, 0.7% Pacific peoples, 2.9% Asian, and 0.4% other ethnicities (totals add to more than 100% since people could identify with multiple ethnicities).

The proportion of people born overseas was 13.0%, compared with 27.1% nationally.

Although some people objected to giving their religion, 54.1% had no religion, 34.7% were Christian, 0.2% were Hindu, 0.2% were Buddhist and 1.8% had other religions.

Of those at least 15 years old, 159 (14.3%) people had a bachelor or higher degree, and 267 (24.1%) people had no formal qualifications. The median income was $27,800, compared with $31,800 nationally. 135 people (12.2%) earned over $70,000 compared to 17.2% nationally. The employment status of those at least 15 was that 540 (48.6%) people were employed full-time, 216 (19.5%) were part-time, and 18 (1.6%) were unemployed.

Education
Dunback Public School was established in 1877 and closed in 2001. In the early 20th century, the school had a roll of 63 in a five-room building.

References

Populated places in Otago
Waitaki District